The Life Is Good Company is an American apparel and accessories wholesaler, retailer, and lifestyle brand founded in 1994 and best known for its optimistic happy go lucky T-shirts and hats, many of which feature a smiling stick figure named Jake and the  registered trademark "Life is good."

History

In 1989, brothers Bert and John Jacobs, who grew up in Needham, Massachusetts, designed their first T-shirts. They began selling their designs in the streets of Boston and out of an old van at colleges and street fairs along the East Coast of the United States. In 1994, following a not-so-successful road trip, they returned to Boston, unsure of the future of their business. It was their common practice to gather friends at their apartment following such trips to share stories and to ask their friends to comment on drawings and sayings posted on their living room walls. On this occasion, one drawing received considerable favorable attention from their friends — the head of a beret-wearing, smiling stick figure and the phrase "Life is good." The brothers named the character Jake and printed up 48 shirts bearing a smiling Jake and the words "Life is good." At a street fair in Cambridge, Massachusetts, the shirts sold out in less than an hour. The brothers began to sell T-shirts and hats featuring Jake in local stores. Sales grew quickly and they hit the $100 million sales mark by 2007.

Life is Good expanded its product lines from T-shirts and caps in the early years to a full line of apparel for men, women, and children, as well as an increasing number of accessories categories. They created their motto, "Do what you like, like what you do." They offer over 900 different items in 14 categories. Products are sold online via the company's website, in approximately 4,500 retail stores in the United States, and in 30 countries.  Life is Good donates 10% of its profits to improving children's lives through their Life is Good Kids Foundation.

Retail
Life is Good products are sold in approximately 4,500 retail stores throughout the United States and Canada. The brand is distributed through multiple customer channels.

Philanthropy                                                             
Life is Good is founded on the belief in spreading optimism. So how does the Life is Good company handle the times when life is not so good? After the tragic day of 9/11, people were claiming they no longer believed life was good anymore. After so many deaths and so many injuries it is hard to keep up the "good vibes". The Jacob's brothers designed a T-shirt that displayed an American flag proudly on the front. The sales of the particular T-shirt went to charity, this gesture widened their customer support. Another historical tragedy, the Boston Marathon bombing in 2013, bringing on a hard time for the people of Boston. The Jacob's brothers company base was located in Boston, so they decided to do something. They created a T-shirt with the city's name on the front, a heart replacing the O, and the legend, "There's nothing stronger than love" on the back of the shirt. All of the profits from this sale went to charity, and it was one of Life is Good's bestselling item at the time. When the corona virus struck the country, Life is Good was uncertain of how to take action, or even if they should take action. After a meeting with all of their employees they came to a group decision to continue working. Work stations were set up 10 feet apart, and their employees got right back to work. The Life is Good company only grew during the pandemic, and of course...they made a T-shirt. For the graduating classes they created a T-shirt that said, "Class of 2020: 'virtually' the greatest class of all time", which was a big hit among the students. Another shirt they created displayed "Covid, be gone!" on the front. When Life's not good, the Jacob brother's think that makes their brand even more relevant.

During the annual Life is Good Festival they have raised over 1 million dollars for the Life is Good Kids Foundation.

Life is Good donates 10% of its net profits to the Life is Good Kids Foundation to support the Life is Good Playmakers foundation, which works to mitigate the effects of adverse childhood experiences.

To this day the Life is Good Foundation inspires optimism, and receives emails and letters from customers who were inspired by them. Their website shares stories about some of these individuals who found hope and joy through the Life is Good company.

References

Sources

External links 
 

Clothing retailers of the United States
American companies established in 1994
Clothing companies established in 1994
Retail companies established in 1994
Companies based in Boston
Positive psychology
1994 establishments in Massachusetts
Privately held companies based in Massachusetts